Elena Igorevna Kirillova, (born 27 January 1986), née Elena Danilochkina, is a Russian basketball player. She played as a shooting guard for the Russian women's national team and Nadezhda Orenburg in the Russian Premier League. She then switched to Dynamo Kursk in 2016, winning with her team the EuroLeague in 2017.

Danilochkina led Russia to the gold medal at the EuroBasket Women 2011 and was voted the Most Valuable Player of the tournament. Her team placed fourth at the 2012 Summer Olympics.

References

Russian women's basketball players
1986 births
Living people
Basketball players at the 2012 Summer Olympics
Olympic basketball players of Russia
Basketball players from Moscow
Shooting guards
Universiade medalists in basketball
Universiade silver medalists for Russia